Saffet is a Turkish given name mostly for males. People named Saffet include:

Saffet Pasha, Grand Vizier of the Ottoman Empire
Saffet Atabinen, Ottoman and Turkish orchestra conductor
Saffet Arıkan, Ottoman military officer and Turkish politician
Saffet Sancaklı, Turkish footballer

Turkish masculine given names